Someshwara or its variant spellings Someshwar and Someshvara may refer to:

 Soma (deity), a Vedic Hindu deity
 Shiva, a Hindu deity

People

 Someshvara I, 11th-century Indian king from the Western Chalukya dynasty
 Someshvara II, 11th-century Indian king from the Western Chalukya dynasty
 Someshvara III, 12th-century Indian king from the Western Chalukya dynasty
 Someshvara IV, 12th-century Indian king from the Western Chalukya dynasty
 Someshvara (13th-century poet), 13th-century Indian poet from the Chaulukya kingdom of Gujarat
 Someshvara (Chahamana dynasty), 12th-century Indian king from the Chahamana dynasty of present-day Rajasthan
 Someshvara (Shilahara dynasty), 13th-century Indian king from the Shilahara dynasty of Konkan
 Someshvara (Hoysala dynasty), 13th-century Indian king from the Hoysala dynasty of present-day Karnataka
 Someswar Kakoti, 20th-century Indian independence activist from Assam

Temples

 Someshwara Temple, Kolar, Hindu temple in Karnataka
 Halasuru Someshwara Temple, Bangalore, Hindu temple in Karnataka
 Someshvara Temple, Haranhalli, Hindu temple in Karnataka
 Someshwar Mahadev Temple, Hindu temple in Gujarat
 Someshwara Swamy Temple, Hindu temple in Bangalore, Karnataka
 Someshwara Temple, Marathahalli, Hindu temple in Bangalore, Karnataka
 Someswaran Temple, Hindu temple in Tamil Nadu
 Somesvara Siva Temple, Hindu temple in Odisha

Places

 Someshwar, Karkala taluk, a village in Karnataka, India
 Someshwara Wildlife Sanctuary, Karnataka, India
 Someshwar (Uttarakhand), a city in Uttarakhand, India

See also 
 Someswaram, a village in Andhra Pradesh